Bhandaria is an upazila of Pirojpur District in the Division of Barisal, Bangladesh.

Geography
It has 27,969 households and a total area of 163.56 km2.

Demographics
According to the 1991 Bangladesh census, Bhandaria had a population of 145,233. Males constituted 50.34% of the population, and females 49.66%. The population aged 18 or over was 74,509. Bhandaria had an average literacy rate of 51.9% (7+ years), compared to the national average of 32.4%.

Administration
Bhandaria Upazila is divided into seven union parishads: Bhandaria, Bhitabaria, Dhaoa, Gouripur, Ikri, Nudmulla, and Telikhali. The union parishads are subdivided into 37 mauzas and 45 villages.

Notable people
Ayub Ali (1919–1995), Islamic scholar and educationist

References

Upazilas of Pirojpur District